Athensville Township is one of thirteen townships in Greene County, Illinois, USA.  As of the 2010 census, its population was 343 and it contained 159 housing units.

Geography

Unincorporated towns
 Athensville at 
(This list is based on USGS data and may include former settlements.)

Cemeteries
The township contains these 10 cemeteries: Athensville, Barnett Number 1, Ceres, Jackson, Old Hopper Homestead, Reeve-Mayberry, Richwoods, Rhodes, Sheppard and Union Prather.

Major highways
  U.S. Route 67

Demographics

School districts
 Franklin Community Unit School District 1
 Greenfield Community Unit School District 10
 North Greene Unit School District 3

Political districts
 Illinois' 17th congressional district
 State House District 97
 State Senate District 49

References
 
 United States Census Bureau 2007 TIGER/Line Shapefiles
 United States National Atlas

External links
 City-Data.com
 Illinois State Archives

Townships in Greene County, Illinois
Townships in Illinois